Örenyurt is a village in Gemerek in the Turkish province of Sivas. Örenyurt is the most northern place in Gemerek. Because the height of the village it can be very cold during the winter months. Bulhasan and Keklicek are the nearest villages to Orenyurt.

The kangal dog is the symbol of Sivas which originated in this region.

History 
The history of the village goes back to the 19th century. It was founded by the leader of the Pasa clan Kuloglu.

Some of the most known families are the Pasa's (Yildirim family), Körhasan's, Seyid's (Sahin en Özmen) Teyin's, Topalosman's, Hasanell's (Duman family) and Uzunoglan's. The Pasa's were the founders of Örenyurt. Kuloglu, Hasan Kah and Abdurrahman are one of the most known leaders of this family group.

Economy

Coat of arms 
The coat of arms of Örenyurt (Turkish: Örenyurt Amblemi) consists of a kangal supporting a shield. The kangal, Kabardic tree en the Karasivri mountain are Örenyurt symbols dating from the first beginning.

Flag 

The flag of Örenyurt, consists of two unequal horizontal bands of blue and orange and a Turkish flag in the same height as the blue band in the canton. The blue band bears a kangal and the Karasivri in the center. It was adopted on 2016.

Places 
Karasivri: the mountain near to Örenyurt.

Kabardic: an old tree in Örenyurt.

Üçoluk: a new accommodation place for the citizens.

Hayraten: old hayrats.

The Mosque of Örenyurt: a big green mosque in the center of the village.

References

Villages in Gemerek District